Isla is a feminine given name traditionally of primarily Scottish usage, derived from "Islay", which is the name of an island off the west coast of Scotland. It is also the name of two Scottish rivers. The root word has no known origin.

The name has increased in popularity in recent years in English-speaking countries.

The name in its original form was Ilay or Islay (e.g. Ilay Campbell), and it was a masculine given name, and was rare among women. Today Isla is regarded as a distinctly female name and Islay a rare male name. Other forms of the girls' name derived from alternate historical spellings of the Scottish island's name include Ile and Ila.

Notable people with the given name include:

 Isla Blair (born 1944), British actress
 Isla Bryson, Scottish transgender criminal 
 Isla Cameron (c. 1930–1980), Scottish actress and singer
 Isla Dewar (1946–2021), Scottish novelist and screenwriter
 Isla Fisher (born 1976), Australian actress
 Ila Loetscher, early-twentieth century women's aviation pioneer and explorer
 Isla Phillips (born 2012), granddaughter of Anne, Princess Royal and great-granddaughter of Queen Elizabeth II
 Isla St Clair (born 1952), Scottish actress and singer
 Isla Traquair (born 1980), Scottish broadcast journalist

References

English feminine given names
Scottish feminine given names